General elections were held in Antigua and Barbuda on 21 March 2018 to elect members to House of Representatives of the 15th Antigua and Barbuda Parliament. Each of the 17 constituencies elected one Member of Parliament (MP).

The governing Antigua and Barbuda Labour Party led by Gaston Browne was returned to power, winning 15 of the 17 seats, increasing their majority by one seat. The United Progressive Party, the official opposition, led by Harold Lovell, was reduced to a single seat and Lovell failed to be elected.

Electoral system
The 17 elected members of the House of Representatives were elected in single-member constituencies by first-past-the-post voting; 16 of the seats were allocated for the island of Antigua and one for the island of Barbuda. Barbudan electors were required to travel to Antigua to vote as a result of the aftermath of hurricane Irma.

Campaign
A total of 53 candidates contested the elections, representing seven parties. The Antigua and Barbuda Labour Party nominated a full slate of 17 candidates. The United Progressive Party nominated candidates only on the island of Antugua due to an electoral pact with the Barbuda People's Movement which stood only on the island of Barbuda. Together they fielded a candidate in every seat. The Democratic National Alliance (13) were the only other party to contest more than half the seats. The Antigua Barbuda True Labour Party and Go Green for Life both had two candidates, while the Barbuda People's Movement (affiliated to the United Progressive Party) and Missing Link VOP had a single candidate. A single independent candidate, Attorney-at-law Ralph Francis, contested the seat of Barbuda.

Prime Minister Gaston Browne dissolved parliament fifteen months early. The main issues were the re-building and response to the 2017 Hurricane season, the Barbudan communal land ownership law, tourism resorts notably the Sandals Resorts, and a bribery scandal involving Browne.

Results

By constituency

References

Elections in Antigua and Barbuda
Antigua
2018 in Antigua and Barbuda
March 2018 events in North America